SS Florian was an Ellerman Lines cargo steamship that was launched in 1939 and completed in 1940. A U-boat sank her with all hands in 1941 in the Battle of the Atlantic.

This was the first Ellerman Lines ship called Florian. The second was a motor ship that was built in 1955, sold in 1971 and renamed Maldive Loyalty, and scrapped in 1982.

Building
Florian was one of a set of four sister ships that William Gray & Company built for the Ellerman & Papayanni Lines subsidiary of Ellerman Lines. She was followed by Belgravian in 1937, Ionian in 1938 and finally Florian in 1939–40.

William Gray & Co built Florian at West Hartlepool yard, launching her on 26 January 1940 and completing her that April.

Florian had one screw. Gray's Central Marine Engineering Works built her engines. Her main engine was a steam triple expansion engine. It was supplemented by a Bauer-Wach low-pressure exhaust steam turbine, which ran on exhaust steam from the low pressure cylinder of her piston engine. Via double reduction gearing and a Föttinger fluid coupling the turbine drove the same propeller shaft as her piston engine.

Service and loss
On 17 April 1940 Florian left Middlesbrough on her maiden voyage. She sailed to the Eastern Mediterranean via Hull, Southend, Gibraltar and Malta. She visited ports in Egypt, Palestine and Cyprus in May 1940 before returning via Gibraltar to Liverpool. Apart from her time in the Mediterranean, Florian sailed mostly in convoys.

After France capitulated in June 1940 Florian was transferred to transatlantic service. On 3 July she left Liverpool for New York, where she arrived on 16 July. She then made two round trips between New York and Hull, sailing in the HX convoys HX 61 and HX 75 from Halifax, Nova Scotia to the Firth of Forth for her eastbound crossings.

Florian spent Christmas 1940 and saw in the New Year 1941 in Hull. On 9 January she left the Humber in ballast for New York. She sailed with Convoy FN 378 from Spurn to the Forth and Convoy EN 56/1 from the Forth around the north coast of Scotland, but then sailed independently to cross the Atlantic.

Early on the evening of 19 January  started to chase Florian. She sank stern-first in 42 seconds, killing all 42 members of her crew and her two DEMS gunners.

References

Bibliography

1940 ships
Cargo ships of the United Kingdom
Maritime incidents in January 1941
Ships built on the River Tees
Ships lost with all hands
Ships sunk by German submarines in World War II
Steamships of the United Kingdom
World War II merchant ships of the United Kingdom
World War II shipwrecks in the Atlantic Ocean